Perigonia jamaicensis is a moth of the  family Sphingidae. It lives in Jamaica.

References

jamaicensis
Moths of the Caribbean
Endemic fauna of Jamaica
Lepidoptera of Jamaica
Moths described in 1894